On 15 January 1982, a bomb exploded in the Jewish Mifgash-Israel restaurant in West Berlin, West Germany, killing a child and wounding 46 people. Responsibility was claimed by Palestinian nationalists under the names "People's Federation for a Free Palestine" and the "Arab May 15 Organization for the Liberation of Palestine" in two separate claims. Six Palestinian suspected members of the Popular Front for the Liberation of Palestine (PFLP) were detained by police but released. Mohammed Rashid of the 15 May Organization who led the bombing of Pan Am Flight 830 on 11 August 1982 later reportedly provided information to investigators about the attack. Yehuda Zvi Blum, Israeli Ambassador to the United Nations, said that the Palestine Liberation Organization (PLO) was responsible for the attack.

See also
 Goldenberg restaurant attack

References

1982 crimes in Germany
1982 in international relations
1982 in West Germany
1982 murders in Germany
1982 restaurant bombing
Antisemitic attacks and incidents in Europe
Attacks on buildings and structures in 1982
1982 restaurant bombing
Attacks on restaurants in Europe
1982 restaurant bombing
Improvised explosive device bombings in 1982
January 1982 crimes
January 1982 events in Europe
1982 restaurant bombing
Palestinian terrorist incidents in Germany
1982 restaurant bombing
Terrorist incidents in Germany in 1982
Building bombings in Germany
1980s murders in Berlin
Jews and Judaism in Berlin